The École nationale supérieure d'électrotechnique, d'électronique, d'informatique, d'hydraulique et des télécommunications (ENSEEIHT) is a French engineering school (Grande École) which offers education in Electrical Engineering, Electronics, Computer Science, Hydraulics and Telecommunications.

The INP-ENSEEIHT is a top-ranking French public engineering school, under the trust of the Ministry of National Education, Higher Education and Research and in an agreement with the prestigious Ecole polytechnique. INP-ENSEEIHT is one of the seven components of the National Polytechnic Institute of Toulouse.

The standard curriculum is a three-year program leading to the French Diplôme d'Ingénieur, considered by European universities (Bologna declaration) as a master's degree of the European Higher Education Area. 
The ENSEEIHT is part of Institut National Polytechnique de Toulouse (Toulouse INP) which is itself part of the University of Toulouse. The school is also an associated school of the Institut Mines-Télécom.

History

The school was founded in 1907 by the Toulouse city council with the purpose of training engineers for the South-Western France electrical and hydraulic networks development.

In the 1930s, Charles Camichel, the first director of the school, develops research on hydraulics. Hydraulics then contributed to the reputation of the school.

In 1948, the school became an ENSI - French abbreviation for National Superior School of Engineering - under the direction of Léopold Escande. This was an acknowledgement of the high level of the training and the research works.

Admissions
As a Grande École, the school recruits the majority of the students after the selection made by the competitive examination which is the final step of two years of intensive Classes Préparatoires aux Grandes Écoles. Each department has its own required admission rank that is determined by the number of candidates that want to integrate the department. Other ways to integrate the school exist, some students are admitted to the school after the university or after two years of specific integrated preparatory classes at the Institut National Polytechnique de Toulouse.

Academics

Programs
The standard curriculum is the French specific three-year program in engineering that leads to the Diplôme d'Ingénieur degree. This degree is officially considered as a master's degree of the European Higher Education Area by the European Bologna declaration.

The five departments of the school are :
 Electrical Engineering and Automation
 Electronics and Signal Processing
 Computer Science and Applied Mathematics
 Hydraulics and Fluid Mechanics
 Telecommunications and Networks

The school also delivers Mastères Spécialisés (Specialized Masters), that are one or two years specialized programs in research that can be made after a master's degree.

Double degree
The school offers several opportunities to achieve a double degree with, for example, Georgia Institute of Technology (Georgia Tech) in Atlanta, GA (USA), Chalmers University of Technology in Gothenburg, Sweden or with Imperial College in London, United Kingdom.

Partnerships
For many years, the school has established many partnerships with other French and international universities and institutes of technology.

The ENSEEIHT is also an application school for the very prestigious École polytechnique.

Alumni

CEOs and top-managers
Frédéric Giron, Vice-President at Springboard Research India.
Robert Havas, Director of the National Agency for Industry Innovation.
Marc Jalabert, Marketing and Operations Director at Microsoft France.
Bernard Parisot, President and co-CEO of JCDecaux North America
Jérôme Seydoux, a French businessman, former CEO and current co-president of Pathé, the French most influential company in cinema production, distribution and theaters.
Laurent Rossi, chief executive officer at Automobiles Alpine and Alpine F1 Team
Denis Terrien, Founder and former Director at amazon.fr
Antoine Zacharias, former CEO of Vinci (CAC 40 firm)
Nawfal Trabelsi, CEO of McDonald France

Entrepreneurs
Michel Meyer, Founder of Multimania and Kewego
Erik Robertson, Founder of Multimania and founding CTO of Vistaprint
Frédéric Montagnon, Founder of Overblog, Nomao and Codanova
Eric Hautemont, Founder of Raydream and Days of Wonder
Pascal Belloncle, Founder of Raydream
Andy Albani, Co-Founder and CEO of Dance Reality and Founder of HurryOut

Other
 Laurent Broomhead, French National television show presenter
 Sophie Lacaze, composer
 Gauvain Sers, singer and songwriter.

See also
National Polytechnic Institute of Toulouse
Institut Télécom
University of Toulouse

References

External links
Official website
ENSEEIHT alumni website

Universities and colleges in Toulouse
Toulouse Institute of Technology
University of Toulouse
Engineering universities and colleges in France
Technical universities and colleges in France
Educational institutions established in 1907
Grandes écoles
1907 establishments in France